was a Japanese painter, noted for his work in combining Japanese legends and religious subjects with the yōga (Western-style) art movement in late 19th- and early 20th-century Japanese painting.

Biography
Aoki was born to an ex-samurai class household in Kurume, in northern Kyūshū, Japan, where his father had been a retainer of the Arima clan daimyō of Kurume Domain. Although his family strongly disapproved of his interest in art, he left home in 1899 to pursue his studies in Tokyo, first with Koyama Shōtarō, a pupil of the Italian foreign advisor Antonio Fontanesi, who had been hired by the Meiji government in the late 1870s to introduce western oil painting to Japan. From 1900 he became a pupil of Kuroda Seiki, then an instructor at the Tōkyō Bijutsu Gakkō (present-day Tokyo National University of Fine Arts and Music). In the autumn of 1902, he travelled to Mount Myōgi in Gunma Prefecture and to Nagano Prefecture on a sketching excursion. After his return, he displayed some of his completed works at Kuroda's 8th Hakuba-kai Exhibition, where his use of the techniques of the Pre-Raphaelite Brotherhood combined with themes from the Kojiki resulted in great critical acclaim.

Aoki finished his studies in 1904. In August 1905, he relocated to what is now Chikusei, Ibaraki, where he had a son by his common law wife Tane Fukuda. The son (Rando Fukuda, 1905–1976) would later become a noted shakuhachi musician. However, Fukuda returned home to take care of her ill father in August 1907, the relationship came to an end. From October 1908, he abandoned his house and went on an extended painting trip, creating numerous works, but never settling in any location for an extended period of time. In March 1911, he checked into a hospital in Fukuoka suffering from tuberculosis, where he died at the age of 28.

A number of Aoki's works have been collected by the Ishibashi Museum of Art in his hometown of Kurume, two of which have been recognized by the Japanese government's Agency for Cultural Affairs as Important Cultural Properties.

Noted works
, 1903, Tokyo University of the Arts 
, 1904, Bridgestone Art Museum
, 1904, Ishibashi Museum of Art, National Important Cultural Property. 
, 1905, Ishibashi Museum of Art
, 1906, Tokyo National Museum
, 1907 (Ishibashi Museum of Art), National Important Cultural Property.

References
 Keene, Donald. Dawn to the West. Columbia University Press; (1998). 
 Mason, Penelope. History of Japanese Art . Prentice Hall (2005). 
 Sadao, Tsuneko. Discovering the Arts of Japan: A Historical Overview. Kodansha International (2003). 
 Schaarschmidt Richte. Japanese Modern Art Painting From 1910 . Edition Stemmle. 
 Weisenfeld, Gennifer. MAVO: Japanese Artists and the Avant-Garde, 1905-1931. University of California Press (2001).

External links

Ishibashi Museum of Art

1882 births
1911 deaths
People from Kurume
20th-century deaths from tuberculosis
Tuberculosis deaths in Japan
20th-century Japanese painters

[es]: Shigeru Aoki